Tryptophan N-monooxygenase (tryptophan N-hydroxylase, CYP79B1, CYP79B2, CYP79B3) is an enzyme with systematic name L-tryptophan,NADPH:oxygen oxidoreductase (N-hydroxylating). This enzyme catalyses the following chemical reaction

 L-tryptophan + 2 O2 + 2 NADPH + 2 H+  (E)-indol-3-ylacetaldoxime + 2 NADP+ + CO2 + 3 H2O (overall reaction)
(1a) L-tryptophan + O2 + NADPH + H+  N-hydroxy-L-tryptophan + NADP+ + H2O
(1b) N-hydroxy-L-tryptophan + O2 + NADPH + H+  N,N-dihydroxy-L-tryptophan + NADP+ + H2O
(1c) N,N-dihydroxy-L-tryptophan  (E)-indol-3-ylacetaldoxime + CO2 + H2O

Tryptophan N-monooxygenase is a heme-thiolate protein (P-450).

References

External links 
 

EC 1.14.13